Zuidbroek (Gronings: Zuudbrouk) is a village in the Dutch province of Groningen. It is located in the municipality of Midden-Groningen, about 6 km north of Veendam.

History 
Zuidbroek was a separate municipality until 1965, when it became a part of Oosterbroek. Oosterbroek was merged with Meeden and Muntendam in 1990 and renamed to Menterwolde a year later.

In 2014, the Noord-Nederlands Trein & Tram Museum at the Zuidbroek railway station was opened.

Infrastructure 
The Zuidbroek railway station is situated on the Harlingen–Nieuweschans railway and Stadskanaal–Zuidbroek railway.

Gallery

References

External links
 

Former municipalities of Groningen (province)
Populated places in Groningen (province)
Midden-Groningen